The siege of Erivan took place from October to November 1808, during the Russo-Persian War of 1804-1813. As in 1804, the Iranians successfully defended the city and forced the Russians to withdraw.

The Russian campaign, launched late in the season and poorly conceived, failed after a six-week siege of the Iranian fortress of Erivan. The Russians had suffered 3,000 casualties with almost 1,000 deaths. 

Russian field marshal Ivan Gudovich tried to excuse his defeat by claiming that French military officers had helped the Iranians, but Gudovich's superiors, as modern historian Alexander Mikaberidze explains, "knew better". Tsar Alexander I was severely dissatisfied; when he heard about Gudovich's failure, he named his expedition as "stupid", and without any sort of compassion, sent him into retirement.

References

Sources

Further reading
 

Battles involving Russia
Battles involving Qajar Iran
Conflicts in 1808
19th century in Armenia
1808 in the Russian Empire
Battles of the Russo-Persian Wars
1808 in Iran
History of Yerevan